Caryocolum blandella is a moth of the family Gelechiidae. It is found from central and northern Europe to the Ural Mountains and southern Siberia.

The larvae feed on Stellaria holostea. Young larvae mine the leaves of their host plant. They can be found from April to June.

References

External links
 
 lepiforum.de 
 UK Moths

blandella
Moths described in 1852
Moths of Asia
Moths of Europe
Taxa named by John William Douglas